This list attempts to list the field artillery regiments of the United States Army and United States Marine Corps. As the U.S. Army field artillery evolved, regimental lineages of the artillery, including air defense artillery, coast artillery, and field artillery were intermingled. This list is only concerned with field artillery. Where possible, the active components of the regiments are listed. Inactive units are listed by regiment, and their elements are not listed.

U.S. Army

Current Active Component
1st Field Artillery Regiment
4th Battalion is the cannon battalion assigned to the 3rd Armored BCT, 1st Armored Division, stationed at Fort Bliss, Texas
2nd Field Artillery Regiment
2nd Battalion is a training support battalion assigned to the 428th Field Artillery Brigade, stationed at Fort Sill, Oklahoma
3rd Field Artillery Regiment
2nd Battalion is the cannon battalion assigned to the 1st Stryker BCT, 1st Armored Division, stationed at Fort Bliss, Texas
5th Battalion is a rocket battalion assigned to the 17th Field Artillery Brigade, stationed at Joint Base Lewis-McChord, Washington
4th Field Artillery Regiment
2nd Battalion is a rocket battalion assigned to the 75th Field Artillery Brigade, stationed at Fort Sill, Oklahoma
5th Field Artillery Regiment
1st Battalion is the cannon battalion assigned to the 1st Armored BCT, 1st Infantry Division, stationed at Fort Riley, Kansas
6th Field Artillery Regiment
3rd Battalion is the cannon battalion assigned to the 1st Infantry BCT, 10th Mountain Division, stationed at Fort Drum, NY
7th Field Artillery Regiment
1st Battalion is the cannon battalion assigned to the 2nd Armored BCT, 1st Infantry Division, stationed at Fort Riley, Kansas
3rd Battalion is the cannon battalion assigned to the 3rd Infantry BCT, 25th Infantry Division, stationed at Schofield Barracks, Hawaii
8th Field Artillery Regiment
2nd Battalion is the cannon battalion assigned to the 1st Infantry BCT, 11th Airborne Division, stationed at Fort Wainwright, Alaska
9th Field Artillery Regiment
1st Battalion is the cannon battalion assigned to the 2nd Armored BCT, 3rd Infantry Division, stationed at Fort Stewart, Georgia
11th Field Artillery Regiment
2nd Battalion is the cannon battalion assigned to the 2nd Infantry BCT, 25th Infantry Division, stationed at Schofield Barracks, Hawaii
12th Field Artillery Regiment
2nd Battalion is the cannon battalion assigned to 1st Stryker BCT, 4th Infantry Division, stationed at Fort Carson, Colorado
13th Field Artillery Regiment
3rd Battalion is a rocket battalion assigned to the 75th Field Artillery Brigade, stationed at Fort Sill, Oklahoma
14th Field Artillery Regiment
1st Battalion is a rocket battalion assigned to the 75th Field Artillery Brigade, stationed at Fort Sill, Oklahoma
15th Field Artillery Regiment
2nd Battalion is the cannon battalion assigned to the 2nd Infantry BCT, 10th Mountain Division, stationed at Fort Drum, New York
16th Field Artillery Regiment
3rd Battalion is the cannon battalion assigned to the 2nd Armored BCT, 1st Cavalry Division, stationed at Fort Hood, Texas
17th Field Artillery Regiment
2nd Battalion is the cannon battalion assigned to the 2nd Stryker BCT, 2nd Infantry Division, stationed at Joint Base Lewis-McChord, Washington
18th Field Artillery Regiment
2nd Battalion is a rocket battalion assigned to the 75th Field Artillery Brigade, stationed at Fort Sill, Oklahoma
19th Field Artillery Regiment
1st Battalion is a basic combat training battalion, assigned to the 434th Field Artillery Brigade, stationed at Fort Sill, Oklahoma
20th Field Artillery Regiment (United States)
2nd Battalion is a rocket battalion assigned to the 75th Field Artillery Brigade, stationed at Fort Sill, Oklahoma
25th Field Artillery Regiment
5th Battalion is the cannon battalion assigned to the 3rd Infantry BCT, 10th Mountain Division, stationed at Fort Polk, Louisiana
27th Field Artillery Regiment
3rd Battalion is a rocket battalion assigned to the 18th Field Artillery Brigade, stationed at Fort Bragg, North Carolina
4th Battalion is the cannon battalion assigned to the 2nd Armored BCT, 1st Armored Division, stationed at Fort Bliss, Texas
29th Field Artillery Regiment
3rd Battalion is the cannon battalion assigned to the 3rd Armored BCT, 4th Infantry Division, stationed at Fort Carson, Colorado
30th Field Artillery Regiment (United States)
1st Battalion is a training battalion assigned to the  428th Field Artillery Brigade, stationed at Fort Sill, Oklahoma
31st Field Artillery Regiment
1st Battalion is a basic combat training battalion, assigned to the 434th Field Artillery Brigade, stationed at Fort Sill, Oklahoma
32nd Field Artillery Regiment
2nd Battalion is the cannon battalion assigned to the 1st Infantry BCT, 101st Airborne Division, stationed at Fort Campbell, Kentucky
37th Field Artillery Regiment
1st Battalion is the cannon battalion assigned to the 1st Stryker BCT, 2nd Infantry Division, stationed at Joint Base Lewis-McChord, Washington
6th Battalion is a rocket battalion assigned to the 210th Field Artillery Brigade, stationed at Camp Casey, Korea
38th Field Artillery Regiment
1st Battalion is a rocket battalion assigned to the 210th Field Artillery Brigade, stationed at Camp Casey, Korea"210th Field Artillery Brigade." Web, accessed 27 December 2017.
40th Field Artillery Regiment
1st Battalion is a basic combat training battalion, assigned to the 434th Field Artillery Brigade, stationed at Fort Sill, Oklahoma
41st Field Artillery Regiment
1st Battalion is the cannon battalion assigned to the 1st Armored BCT, 3rd Infantry Division, stationed at Fort Stewart, Georgia
77th Field Artillery Regiment
2nd Battalion is the cannon battalion assigned to the 2nd Infantry BCT, 4th Infantry Division, stationed at Fort Carson, Colorado
78th Field Artillery Regiment
1st Battalion is a training battalion assigned to the  428th Field Artillery Brigade, stationed at Fort Sill, Oklahoma
79th Field Artillery Regiment
1st Battalion is a basic combat training battalion, assigned to the 434th Field Artillery Brigade, stationed at Fort Sill, Oklahoma
82nd Field Artillery Regiment
1st Battalion is the cannon battalion assigned to the 1st Armored BCT, 1st Cavalry Division, stationed at Fort Hood, Texas
2nd Battalion is the cannon battalion assigned to the 3rd Armored BCT, 1st Cavalry Division, stationed at Fort Hood, Texas
94th Field Artillery Regiment
1st Battalion is a rocket battalion assigned to the 17th Field Artillery Brigade, stationed at Joint Base Lewis-McChord, Washington
319th Field Artillery Regiment
1st Battalion is the cannon battalion assigned to the 3rd Airborne BCT, 82nd Airborne Division, stationed at Fort Bragg, NC
2nd Battalion is the cannon battalion assigned to the 2nd Airborne BCT, 82nd Airborne Division, stationed at Fort Bragg, NC
3rd Battalion is the cannon battalion assigned to the 1st Airborne BCT, 82nd Airborne Division, stationed at Fort Bragg, NC
4th Battalion is the cannon battalion assigned to the 173rd Airborne Brigade, stationed at Grafenwöhr Training Area, Germany
320th Field Artillery Regiment
1st Battalion is the cannon battalion assigned to the 2nd Infantry BCT, 101st Airborne Division, stationed at Fort Campbell, Kentucky
3rd Battalion is the cannon battalion assigned to the 3rd Infantry BCT, 101st Airborne Division, stationed at Fort Campbell, Kentucky
321st Field Artillery Regiment
3rd Battalion is a rocket battalion assigned to the 18th Field Artillery Brigade, stationed at Fort Bragg, North Carolina
377th Field Artillery Regiment
2nd Battalion is the cannon battalion assigned to the 2nd Infantry Brigade Combat Team (Airborne), 11th Airborne Division, stationed at Joint Base Elmendorf-Richardson, Alaska

Current Reserve Component
101st Field Artillery Regiment
1st Battalion is the cannon battalion assigned to the 86th Infantry Brigade Combat Team in the Massachusetts ARNG
103rd Field Artillery Regiment
1st Battalion is a cannon battalion in the Rhode Island ARNG,  assigned to the 197th Field Artillery Brigade
107th Field Artillery Regiment
1st Battalion is the cannon battalion assigned to the 2nd Infantry Brigade Combat Team, 28th Infantry Division in the Pennsylvania ARNG
108th Field Artillery Regiment
1st Battalion is the cannon battalion assigned to the 56th Stryker BCT in the Pennsylvania ARNG
111th Field Artillery Regiment
1st Battalion is the cannon battalion assigned to the 116th Infantry BCT in the Virginia ARNG
112th Field Artillery Regiment
3rd Battalion is the cannon battalion assigned to the 50th Infantry BCT in the New Jersey ARNG
113th Field Artillery Regiment
1st Battalion is the M109A7 battalion assigned to the 30th Armored BCT in the North Carolina ARNG
5th Battalion is a HIMARS battalion in the  North Carolina ARNG assigned to the 65th Field Artillery Brigade
114th Field Artillery Regiment
2nd Battalion is the cannon battalion assigned to the 155th Armored BCT in the Mississippi ARNG
116th Field Artillery Regiment
2nd Battalion is the cannon battalion assigned to the 53rd Infantry BCT in the Florida ARNG
3rd Battalion is a rocket battalion in the Florida ARNG assigned to the 138th Field Artillery Brigade
117th Field Artillery Regiment
1st Battalion is a cannon battalion in the Alabama ARNG assigned to the 142nd Field Artillery Brigade
118th Field Artillery Regiment
1st Battalion is the cannon battalion assigned to the 48th Infantry BCT in the Georgia ARNG 
119th Field Artillery Regiment
1st Battalion is a rocket battalion in the Michigan ARNG  assigned to the 197th Field Artillery Brigade
120th Field Artillery Regiment
1st Battalion is the cannon battalion assigned to the 32nd Infantry BCT in the Wisconsin ARNG
121st Field Artillery Regiment
1st Battalion is a rocket battalion in the Wisconsin ARNG assigned to the 115th Field Artillery Brigade
122nd Field Artillery Regiment
2nd Battalion is the cannon battalion assigned to the 33rd Infantry BCT in the Illinois ARNG
123rd Field Artillery Regiment
2nd Battalion is a cannon battalion in the Illinois ARNG assigned to the 169th Field Artillery Brigade
125th Field Artillery Regiment
1st Battalion is the cannon battalion assigned to the 1st Armored BCT, 34th Infantry Division in the Minnesota ARNG
129th Field Artillery Regiment
1st Battalion is a cannon battalion in the Missouri ARNG assigned to the 45th Field Artillery Brigade
130th Field Artillery Regiment
2nd Battalion is a rocket battalion in the Kansas ARNG assigned to the 130th Field Artillery Brigade
133rd Field Artillery Regiment
1st Battalion is the cannon battalion assigned to the 72nd Infantry BCT in the Texas ARNG
3rd Battalion is the cannon battalion assigned to the 56th Infantry BCT in the Texas ARNG
4th Battalion is a HIMARS battalion assigned to the Texas ARNG
134th Field Artillery Regiment
1st Battalion is the cannon battalion assigned to the 37th Infantry BCT in the Ohio ARNG
138th Field Artillery Regiment
2nd Battalion is a cannon battalion in the Kentucky ARNG assigned to the 138th Field Artillery Brigade
141st Field Artillery Regiment
1st Battalion is the cannon battalion assigned to the 256th Infantry BCT in the Louisiana ARNG
142nd Field Artillery Regiment
1st Battalion is a rocket battalion in the Arkansas ARNG assigned to the 142nd Field Artillery Brigade
2nd Battalion is a cannon battalion in the Arkansas ARNG assigned to the 142nd Field Artillery Brigade
143rd Field Artillery Regiment
1st Battalion is the cannon battalion assigned to the 79th Infantry BCT in the California ARNG
144th Field Artillery Regiment
1st Battalion is the cannon battalion in the California ARNG assigned to the 115th Field Artillery Brigade
146th Field Artillery Regiment
2nd Battalion is the cannon battalion assigned to the 81st Stryker BCT in the Washington ARNG
147th Field Artillery Regiment
1st Battalion is a rocket battalion in the South Dakota ARNG assigned to the 115th Field Artillery Brigade
148th Field Artillery Regiment
1st Battalion is the cannon battalion assigned to the 116th Cavalry BCT in the Idaho ARNG
150th Field Artillery Regiment
2nd Battalion is a cannon battalion in the Indiana ARNG assigned to the 138th Field Artillery Brigade
151st Field Artillery Regiment
1st Battalion is a cannon battalion in the Minnesota ARNG assigned to the 115th Field Artillery Brigade
157th Field Artillery Regiment
3rd Battalion is a rocket battalion in the Colorado ARNG assigned to the 169th Field Artillery Brigade
158th Field Artillery Regiment
1st Battalion is a HIMARS battalion in the Oklahoma ARNG assigned to the 45th Field Artillery Brigade
160th Field Artillery Regiment
1st Battalion is the cannon battalion assigned to the 45th Infantry BCT in the Oklahoma ARNG
161st Field Artillery Regiment
1st Battalion is a cannon battalion in the Kansas ARNG
163rd Field Artillery Regiment
1st Battalion is the cannon battalion assigned to the 76th Infantry BCT in the Indiana ARNG
182nd Field Artillery Regiment
1st Battalion is a battalion in the Michigan ARNG assigned to the 197th Field Artillery Brigade
194th Field Artillery Regiment
1st Battalion is the cannon battalion assigned to the 2nd Infantry BCT 34th Infantry Division in the Iowa ARNG
197th Field Artillery Regiment
3rd Battalion is a rocket battalion in the New Hampshire ARNG assigned to the 197th Field Artillery Brigade
201st Field Artillery Regiment
1st Battalion is a cannon battalion in the West Virginia ARNG assigned to the 197th Field Artillery Brigade
206th Field Artillery Regiment
1st Battalion is the cannon battalion assigned to the 39th Infantry BCT in the Arkansas ARNG
214th Field Artillery Regiment
1st Battalion is a cannon battalion in the Georgia ARNG assigned to the 65th Field Artillery Brigade
258th Field Artillery Regiment
1st Battalion is the cannon battalion assigned to the 27th Infantry Brigade Combat Team in the New York Army National Guard

Inactive Regiments
10th Field Artillery Regiment
21st Field Artillery Regiment
22nd Field Artillery Regiment
23rd Field Artillery Regiment
24th Field Artillery Regiment
26th Field Artillery Regiment
28th Field Artillery Regiment
33rd Field Artillery Regiment
34th Field Artillery Regiment
35th Field Artillery Regiment
36th Field Artillery Regiment
39th Field Artillery Regiment
42nd Field Artillery Regiment
73rd Field Artillery Regiment
75th Field Artillery Regiment
76th Field Artillery Regiment
80th Field Artillery Regiment
81st Field Artillery Regiment
83rd Field Artillery Regiment
84th Field Artillery Regiment
86th Field Artillery Regiment
92nd Field Artillery Regiment
102nd Field Artillery Regiment, Massachusetts ARNG
109th Field Artillery Regiment, Pennsylvania ARNG
110th Field Artillery Regiment, Maryland ARNG, converted to Information Operations
115th Field Artillery Regiment, Tennessee ARNG
126th Field Artillery Regiment, Wisconsin ARNG
127th Field Artillery Regiment, Kansas ARNG
128th Field Artillery Regiment, Missouri ARNG
131st Field Artillery Regiment, Texas ARNG
139th Field Artillery Regiment, Indiana ARNG
145th Field Artillery Regiment, Colorado ARNG
152nd Field Artillery Regiment, Maine ARNG
156th Field Artillery Regiment, New York ARNG
162nd Field Artillery Regiment, Puerto Rico ARNG
163rd Field Artillery Regiment, Indiana ARNG
172nd Field Artillery Regiment, New Hampshire ARNG
178th Field Artillery Regiment, South Carolina ARNG
180th Field Artillery Regiment, Arizona ARNG
181st Field Artillery Regiment, Tennessee ARNG
333rd Field Artillery Regiment
355th Field Artillery Regiment, Connecticut Organized Reserve unit of the 76th Division, 1921–1941.

U.S. Marine Corps

Active
10th Marines is assigned to the 2nd Marine Division, stationed at Camp Lejeune, North Carolina
1st Battalion
2nd Battalion
11th Marines is assigned to the 1st Marine Division, stationed at Camp Pendleton, California
1st Battalion
2nd Battalion
3rd Battalion
5th Battalion
12th Marines is assigned to the 3rd Marine Division, stationed in Okinawa, Japan
1st Battalion is stationed at Kaneohe Bay, Hawaii
3rd Battalion is stationed in Okinawa, Japan
14th Marines is assigned to the 4th Marine Division, with headquarters at Fort Worth, Texas.
2nd Battalion is based in Grand Prairie, Texas 
3rd Battalion is based in Bristol, Pennsylvania 
5th Battalion is based in Seal Beach, California

Inactive
13th Marines
15th Marines

See also 

 List of infantry battalions of the Army National Guard from 1959
 List of armored and cavalry regiments of the United States Army

References

Citations

Bibliography 
 

Field artillery regiments